The Golden Jubilee Diamond, a 545.67 carat (109.13 g) brown diamond, is the largest cut and faceted diamond in the world. It outweighs the Cullinan I by 15.37 carats (3.07 g). The Golden Jubilee Diamond was discovered in 1985 at the Premier Mine, which is also the origin of the Cullinan diamond (1905) and other notables such as the Taylor–Burton (1966) and the Centenary (1986). Cullinan I, also known as the Great Star of Africa, had held the title of the largest cut and faceted diamond since 1908.

History 
First known as the "Unnamed Brown", the Golden Jubilee Diamond was cut from a large brown diamond of 755.5 carats (151 g), found in the prolific blue ground of the Premier Mine in South Africa in 1985.

Until 1990, the diamond remained largely unknown to the outside world, requiring two years' work to bring it to its current state. A large surface and deep cracks from the interior, as well as several inclusions, meant that cutting and polishing the large diamond presented challenges. De Beers considered this as an opportunity to test new cutting technologies. The same technology used in cutting the future Golden Jubilee diamond was later used in the cutting of the Centenary Diamond, a smaller (273.85 carats) flawless and colorless rough diamond.

Gabriel Tolkowsky was hired by De Beers to cut the diamond and also so he could test special tools and cutting methods that were being developed for use on the colourless D-colour Centenary.

Because of its cracks and inclusions, it was decided by De Beers and Gabriel Tolkowsky to construct an underground room that was free from vibration before work could begin on the diamond. In 1990, after two years of work, the stone was finished, reduced in total from 755.50 carats, to 545.65 carats. Gabi Tolkowsky described the cut as a "Fire-Rose cushion shape".

The unnamed diamond was brought to Thailand by the Thai Diamond Manufacturers Association to be exhibited in the Thai Board of Investment Exhibition in Laem Chabang and was selected to herald De Beer's centennial celebrations in 1988.

The Golden Jubilee was purchased from De Beers by a group of Thai business people led by Henry Ho in 1995.

It was arranged for the diamond to be given to King Bhumibol as a gift from the people to celebrate the 50th anniversary of the King's ascent to the throne. The diamond was named the Golden Jubilee, and was received by the King's daughter, Princess Maha Chakri Sirindhorn, on his behalf in 2000.

The diamond is now on display in the Royal Museum at Pimammek Golden Temple Throne Hall in Bangkok as part of the crown jewels.

Blessings 
The diamond was brought to Pope John Paul II in the Vatican to receive a papal blessing. It was also blessed by the Buddhist Supreme Patriarch of Thailand.

The diamond was named by King Bhumibol Adulyadej and given to him in honour of his 50th coronation anniversary. It was initially planned to mount the Golden Jubilee in the royal sceptre. A subsequent plan was to mount it in a royal seal.

Exhibitions 
The Golden Jubilee Diamond has been exhibited at Henry Ho's 59-story Jewelry Trade Center in Bangkok, the Central Department Store in Lat Phrao (Bangkok), and internationally in Basel (Switzerland), Borsheims in Omaha, Nebraska, USA (owned by Warren Buffett's Berkshire Hathaway Inc.), and Gleims Jewelers in Palo Alto, California. USA. It is now located in the Grand Palace as part of the royal regalia.

Value 
The value of the Golden Jubilee diamond is believed to range between $4 and $12 million USD. If sold at auction, it is likely that this stone would fetch a significantly higher price, such additional value gained from affiliation with prominent individuals (Thailand royalty).

See also
 List of diamonds

References 

Golden Jubilee
Diamonds originating in South Africa
1985 in South Africa